Sodium maleonitriledithiolate is the chemical compound described by the formula Na2S2C2(CN)2.  The name refers to the cis compound, structurally related to maleonitrile ((CHCN)2).  Maleonitriledithiolate is often abbreviated mnt. It is a "dithiolene", i.e. a chelating alkene-1,2-dithiolate.  It is a prototypical non-innocent ligand in coordination chemistry.  Several  complexes are known, such as [Ni(mnt)2]2−.

The salt is synthesized by treating carbon disulfide with sodium cyanide to give the cyanodithioformate salt, which eliminates elemental sulfur in aqueous solution:
2 NaCN  +  2 CS2   →  Na2S2C2(CN)2  +  1/4 S8

The compound was first described by Bähr and Schleitzer 1958.

References

Thiolates
Alkene derivatives
Sodium compounds
Nitriles
Substances discovered in the 1950s